The 1989 Cal State Northridge  Matadors football team represented California State University, Northridge as a member of the Western Football Conference (WFC) during the 1989 NCAA Division II football season. Led by fourth-year head coach Bob Burt, Cal State Northridge compiled an overall record of 6–5 with a mark of 4–2 in conference play, tying for second place in the WFC. The team was outscored by its opponents 257 to 231 for the season. The Matadors played home games at North Campus Stadium in Northridge, California.

Schedule

Team players in the NFL
The following Cal State Northridge players were selected in the 1990 NFL Draft.

References

Cal State Northridge
Cal State Northridge Matadors football seasons
Cal State Northridge Matadors football